JS Chiyoda (AS 405) was a submarine rescue ship of the Japan Maritime Self-Defense Force.

She was replaced by another ship of the same name, JS Chiyoda (AS 404), 128 m (420 ft) long, with a standard displacement of 5,600 tonnes (6,173 tons),  on 20 March 2018.

History
Chiyoda was built by Mitsui Engineering & Shipbuilding in Tamano. She was laid down on January 19, 1983, and launched later that year on December 7, 1983.

References

1983 ships
Auxiliary ships of the Japan Maritime Self-Defense Force
Ships built by Mitsui Engineering and Shipbuilding
Submarine rescue ships